The Târnava Mică ("Small Târnava";) is a river in Romania. Its source is in the Eastern Carpathian Mountains, in Harghita County. It flows to the west through the Romanian counties Harghita, Mureș, and Alba, more or less parallel to and north from the Târnava Mare. The cities of Sovata and Târnăveni lie on the Târnava Mică. It joins the Târnava Mare in Blaj, forming the Târnava.

Towns and villages

The following towns and villages are situated along the river Târnava Mică, from source to mouth: Praid, Sovata, Sărățeni, Chibed, Ghindari, Sângeorgiu de Pădure, Fântânele, Bălăușeri, Coroisânmărtin, Suplac, Mica, Gănești, Târnăveni, Adămuș, Crăiești, Cetatea de Baltă, Jidvei, Șona, Sâncel, Blaj.

Tributaries

The following rivers are tributaries to the river Târnava Mică (from source to mouth):

Left: Praid, Corund, Solocma, Ceia, Cușmed, Șenie, Roua, Vețca, Ciortoș, Nadeș, Agrișteu, Domald, Seleuș, Sântioana, Cund, Botoș, Hărănglab, Băgaciu, Sărata, Saroș, Adămuș, Balta, Spinoasa, Graben, Ror, Valea Mare

Right: Creanga Mare, Iuhod, Sovata, Becheci, Ghegheș, Veseuș, Broaga, Pănade

References

Rivers of Romania
 
Rivers of Harghita County
Rivers of Mureș County
Rivers of Alba County